Chionanthus zeylanicus is a species of flowering plant in the family Oleaceae. It is endemic to Sri Lanka. Some state that it can also found in Southern India, but it is not accepted yet.

Trunk
Bark - white or gray, smooth.

Culture
Known as "ගෙරි ඇට - geri eta" in Sinhala, and as "kattimuruchan" in Tamil.

References

 http://www.biotik.org/india/species/c/chiozeyl/chiozeyl_en.html
 http://indiabiodiversity.org/species/show/9090

Flora of Sri Lanka
zeylanicus